Independența is a commune in Constanța County, Northern Dobruja, Romania. It includes five villages:
 Independența (historical name: Bairamdede) 
 Fântâna Mare (historical name: Bașpunar) 
 Movila Verde (historical names: Fetești)
 Olteni (historical names: Demircea)
 Tufani (historical names: Cara Agi)

Demographics
At the 2011 census, Independența had 2,333 Romanians (74.8%), 392 Turks (12.6%), 271 Tatars (8.7%), 4 others (0.1%).

References

Communes in Constanța County
Localities in Northern Dobruja
Turkish communities in Romania